Staffort is an old German village between Karlsruhe and Bruchsal - since 1975 the village is part of the town Stutensee which was created by joining together with Blankenloch, Friedrichstal and Spöck. Stutensee-Staffort has roughly 2000 inhabitants (2011).

History
Staffort means "constant trudge ford" (stete stapfen Furt) as the location was the only feasible place to cross the Pfinz River, and so was strategically important in the wider region since ancient times. Excavations and artifacts that were discovered evidence a settlement existing near by the Pfinz 25 AD. The first mention of Staffort occurred in 1110 when the Emperor Heinrich V. named the village Stafphort in an official document.

People

In the municipal book out of 1837 the following existing family names are mentioned: Amolsch, Brauch, Beideck, Dürr, Enderlin, Ernst, Gamer, Glaser, Hager, Hauck, Hauth, Hecht, Heidt, Kohler, Malsch, Maier, Mezger, Nagel, Oberacker, Raupp, Stahl, Stober, Schilling, Scholl, Schoppinger, Sickinger, Süß, Waidmann, Winnes.

During the 18th and 19th centuries nearly 100 inhabitants left the village to relocate in America, Austria, Denmark, Hungary, Jutland, Prussia, Russia, Serbia and Styria.

External links
 Historical Staffort on Stadtwiki Karlsruhe
 Festival 900 Years Staffort
 Webpage Stutensee

Literature
 Wilhelm Hauck: Staffort - Schloß und Dorf an der steten Furt (Ortschronik). Gemeinde Stutensee 1993 
 Manfred G. Raupp: Ortsfamilienbuch Staffort, Herausgeber Stadt Stutensee, Verlag Gesowip Basel 2010,

References

Villages in Baden-Württemberg
Karlsruhe (district)